The Lincoln Service is a  higher-speed rail service operated by Amtrak that runs between Chicago, Illinois and St. Louis, Missouri. The train is a part of the Illinois Service and is partially funded by the Illinois Department of Transportation. A connection with the -bound Missouri River Runner is available in St. Louis.

, the average trip time between Chicago and St. Louis was 5 hours 17 minutes. Future infrastructure upgrades are expected to reduce the time to under 4 hours.

During fiscal year 2016 (ending September '16), the Lincoln Service trains carried 548,955 passengers, a decrease of 4.8% from FY2015.  The service had a total revenue of $14,266,964, a decrease of 1.3% from FY2015.

History
Prior to the Lincoln Service, Amtrak had been operating the State House between Chicago and St. Louis since 1973. Originally intended to connect Chicago and Springfield, Amtrak extended the State House south to St. Louis at its own expense because Springfield station was not designed to turn equipment. The train used a route previously owned by the Alton Railroad, which merged with the Gulf, Mobile and Ohio Railroad (GM&O) in 1947. The GM&O merged with the Illinois Central Railroad in 1972, a year after Amtrak had taken over passenger train service.

As a result of upgrades on the line between Chicago and St. Louis, Amtrak rebranded the State House as the Lincoln Service on October 30, 2006, with two additional round trips. This resulted in the Chicago-St. Louis corridor being served by five daily round trips, including the Texas Eagle and Ann Rutledge which terminated beyond St. Louis. From April 2007 the Ann Rutledge operated only between Kansas City and St. Louis where it connected once daily to the Lincoln Service. The Ann Rutledge was folded into the Missouri River Runner in 2009; one Lincoln Service round trip per day still connects with the Missouri River Runner.

This speed will cut the travel time between Chicago and St. Louis by 90 minutes, bringing the trip to under four hours. The first track upgrade construction was planned to be between Alton and Lincoln, Illinois and was projected to cost $98 million. The construction on this stretch began on September 17, 2010, in Alton and was completed in 2011. Most of the funding came from $1.1 billion in stimulus money for Illinois high-speed rail from the  American Recovery and Reinvestment Act of 2009. The remainder of this grant, as well as $400 million in funding from the state of Illinois, was used to complete a high-speed rail corridor for the remaining portions of the St. Louis–Chicago track. Senator Dick Durbin suggested the Dwight–Alton upgrades would create some 900 jobs, while the overall project could generate 24,000.

On March 22, 2011, an announcement was made in Chicago that an additional $685 million would be used to upgrade trackage and grade crossings between Dwight and Lincoln. Construction on the improvement project began on April 5, 2011.

Although much of track upgrade work was completed between 2010 and 2012, there are additional constructions including second trackage, bridge replacement and rehabilitation, drainage improvements, and grade crossings and signal improvements before the full  service can be fully operated on this route. Amtrak began testing the line for 110 mph revenue service in 2022.

The slowest portion of the corridor is the segment between Chicago and Joliet, but improving this would require an additional $1.5 billion investment. Two projects proposed from the Chicago Region Environmental and Transportation Efficiency Program (CREATE) would remove two diamond crossings and construct an overpass to increase train speed and eliminate delays. One project is in the preliminary design phase while the proposed flyover at Brighton Park crossing is unfunded. As of 2022, an alternative solution rerouting trains via the Rock Island District, which bypasses these diamond crossings and has relatively few freight trains, is being considered. This option would reduce delays and allow higher speeds between Joliet and Chicago.

Effective July 7, 2021, Lincoln Service and Texas Eagle trains were allowed a top speed of  after Federal Railroad Administration dual certification of the Incremental Train Control System and Interoperable Electronic Train Management System between south of Joliet Union Station and Alton, Illinois. On December 13, 2021, scheduled travel times were reduced by approximately 15 minutes between St. Louis and Chicago as a result of the increased speeds.

On May 23, 2022, Amtrak began through-routing one round trip of the Missouri River Runner and Lincoln Service, creating a Kansas City–Chicago round trip.

Rolling stock

A Lincoln Service train consists of the following:
One or two Siemens SC-44 locomotives
Three to seven Amfleet, Horizon Fleet, or Venture coaches 
One Amfleet or Horizon Fleet cafe/business car

Ridership

Route and station stops
The Metra Heritage Corridor commuter line uses the same route from Joliet to Union Station.

{|class="wikitable"
|-
!State
!Town/City
!Station
!Connections
|-
|-*()
|Summit|||| Metra:  Pace Bus: 330
|-
|Joliet||JolietTransportationCenter|| Amtrak:  Metra: ,  Pace Bus: 501, 504, 505, 507, 508, 509, 511, 832, 834
|-
|Dwight||||
|-
|Pontiac|||| Amtrak: 
|-
|Normal|||| Amtrak:  Connect Transit: Green, Red/Exp, Lime, Brown, Tan, Pink, Yellow, Redbird Express Burlington Trailways: Indianapolis, IN - Burlington
|-
|Lincoln|||| Amtrak: 
|-
|Springfield|||| Amtrak:  SMTD: 4, 7, 12, 903
|-
|Carlinville|||| Amtrak: |-
|Alton|||| Amtrak:  Madison County Transit: Route 11
|-
||MO||St. Louis||GatewayTransportationCenter|| Amtrak: ,  MetroLink:   (at ) MetroBus: 4, 8, 10, 11, 32, 74, 80, 94, 99, 36X, 40X, 58X, 410X, 174X Madison County Transit: 1X, 3X, 12X, 14X, 16X, 18X   Greyhound Lines,  Burlington Trailways,  Megabus,  Amtrak Thruway Motorcoach'|}

One Lincoln Service round trip per day connects with the St. Louis-Kansas City Missouri River Runner, providing through service between Chicago and Kansas City. Additionally, one southbound Lincoln Service runs express to St. Louis via Joliet, Bloomington-Normal, Springfield and Alton.

 See also Loop''

References

Notes

External links

Amtrak routes
Higher-speed rail
Passenger rail transportation in Illinois
Passenger rail transportation in Missouri